Lake Hoare is a lake about  long between Lake Chad and Canada Glacier in Taylor Valley, Victoria Land, Antarctica. Its surface area measures . The lake was named by the 8th Victoria University of Wellington Antarctic Expedition (VUWAE), 1963–64, for physicist Ray A. Hoare, a member of the VUWAE that examined lakes in Taylor, Wright, and Victoria Valleys.

Further reading
 Wagner, B., Ortlepp, S., Doran, P., Kenig, F., Melles, M., & Burkemper, A. (2011), The Holocene environmental history of Lake Hoare, Taylor Valley, Antarctica, reconstructed from sediment cores, Antarctic Science, 23(3), 307–319. doi:10.1017/S0954102011000125
 Wagner, B., Ortlepp, S., Doran, P., Kenig, F., Melles, M., & Burkemper, A. (2011),  Sediment transport dynamics on an ice-covered lake: The ‘floating’ boulders of Lake Hoare, Antarctica, Antarctic Science, 27(2), 173–184. doi:10.1017/S0954102014000558
 Gary D. Clow, Christopher P. McKay, George M. Simmons Jr., Robert A. Wharton Jr., Climatological Observations and Predicted Sublimation Rates at Lake Hoare, Antarctica, U.S. Geological Survey, Menlo Park, California
 Tae Hamm, Geochemical Evolution of Meltwater from Glacier Snow to Proglacial Lake, 1 June 2018
  Johanna Laybourn-Parry, Jemma Wadham, Antarctic Lakes, Oxford University Press, 2014
  Ana María Alonso-Zarza, Lawrence H. Tanner, Paleoenvironmental Record and Applications of Calcretes and Palustrine Carbonates, PP 94 - 102

References

Lakes of Victoria Land
McMurdo Dry Valleys